Legend of the Moles: The Treasure of Scylla (Chinese: 摩尔庄园2海妖宝藏) is a 2012 Chinese animated film.

See also
Legend of the Moles: The Frozen Horror (2011)
Legend of the Moles – The Magic Train Adventure (2015)

References

Chinese animated films
2012 animated films
2012 films